Muruga is a 2007 Indian Tamil language film written and directed by R. T. Neason, starring Ashok, Shruti Sharma and Vadivelu. The story, screenplay and dialogues are by RT Neason, who has worked as an assistant to Udayasankar and Vincent Selva. Ram Senthil Kumar's Cocktail Dream Productions distributed the movie. The camera operator was Padmesh and the music is by Kartik Raja.

Plot
Murugan (Ashok) falls in love with his schoolmate Amudha (Shruti Sharma), a rich girl who does not love him in return. When the news of Murugan's love reaches her family, Amudha's uncle Selvam (Riyaz Khan) tries to kill him, ultimately banishing Murugan and his mother from the village. Saddened, Murugan goes to Chennai and ends up with a job as a delivery boy. Having given up all hope of ever seeing Amutha again, he bumps into her when making a delivery at a medical college. Forgetting the past and her family's issues, the two become good friends, and this friendship develops into love. After completing her studies, Amutha returns to the village, only to discover that wedding preparations are underway as her parents had arranged for her to marry Selvam. Finally, Murugan and Amudha succeed in getting married with Amudha's father's blessings.

Cast
 Ashok as Murugan
 Shruti Sharma as Amudha
 Vadivelu as "Courier" Gopu
 Riyaz Khan as Selvam
 Mahadevan
 Chitra Shenoy as Amudha's Mother
 Manobala
 Vincent Asokan
 Pandi
 R. Thyagarajan
 Bava Lakshmanan
 Samiksha Singh as an item number

Reception
India Glitz congratulated debutant director R. T. Neason for not creating a formulaic Tamil film. Ashok and Sruthi Sharma were praised for making the best advantage of their roles, but Vadivelu's character's humour was panned. Special note was taken of Mahadevan for the solidity he brought to his character, and to the musical score created by Karthik Raja. While noting that the film's length could have benefited from trimming, the reviewer wrote, "The director has made an honest and sincere attempt to give a film which has a good storyline and interesting screenplay."

Oneindia review felt the film did not make an impact. The review concluded, "If the Director conceived more twistful and interesting sequences in the screenplay, the film could be more enjoyable."

Soundtrack
The film's soundtrack had its official launch in November 2006.

Track list
Lyrics written by Na. Muthukumar.

 "Kuthuna" by Shankar Mahadevan 
 "En Kathali" by Karthik
 "Chinnanchiru Chitte" by Vineeth Srinivasan and Sangeetha Rajeshwaran
 "Melathe Kottu" by Tippu, Sujatha and Malgudi Subha 
 "Pollatha Kirukku" by Udit Narayan and Shreya Ghosal

References

2007 films
2000s Tamil-language films
2007 directorial debut films
Films scored by Karthik Raja